The Cambridge Film Festival is the third-longest-running film festival in the UK. The festival historically took place during early July, but now takes place annually during Autumn in Cambridge. It is organised by the registered charity Cambridge Film Trust.

Established in 1977 and re-launched in 2001 after a 5-year hiatus, the Cambridge Film Festival shows a range of UK and international films that debuted at leading film festivals, including the Cannes Film Festival and Berlin Film Festival, as well as hosting UK premieres of films, alongside a broad range of specialist interest, archive, and retrospective strands. All films are open to the public to watch.

Each year the Festival awards audience awards to the Best Feature (The Golden Punt Award), Best Documentary (Silver Punt Award), and Best Short Film (Crystal Punt Award).

About

The Cambridge Film Festival is presented annually by the Cambridge Film Trust, a registered charity with a mission to foster film culture and education for the benefit of the public, in Cambridge and the Eastern region but also throughout the UK.
The Festival believes "passionately in the power of film as a medium that can change lives and make the world a better place. It can expose people to new perspectives and ideas, aiding cross-cultural understanding and contributing to community engagement and well being."

Long time Festival Director, Tony Jones, stepped down from his role following the 2019 Festival. Over more than 30 years he had overseen all aspects of the Festival. Following his departure, the Film Trust board (on which Tony Jones remains a trustee) looked to broaden the team and bring a range of new voices to the Festival. As well as an established strong delivery team, a new Programming Panel was set-up, incorporating new and existing CFF Programmers. The Panel was fully established in 2022 under the leadership of Elle Haywood, a film curator and critic with a background in film, media and technology. The panel includes programmers Savina Petkova, Amon Warmann, Camera Catalonia Programmer Ramon Lamarca, Short Film Programmer Abby Pollock and Programme Advisors from the Cambridge Film Trust, Mike O'Brien and Isabelle McNeill.

Editions

1977–1979

1977
In 1977 the first Festival set the pattern for innovation, diversity and the emphasis on world cinema, with screenings of Kurosawa's DODESKA-DEN, Visconti's CONVERSATION PIECE and Rosi's ILLUSTRIOUS CORPSES.

Originally based at the single-screen Arts Cinema in Cambridge city centre's Market Passage, the Festival was originally conceived with a two-fold purpose: as a means of screening current international cinema; and to rediscover important but neglected film-makers and their films, which were either out of distribution or unseen for many years.

1978
The second Cambridge Film Festival in 1978 hosted the UK Premiere of The Chess Players. It was the centrepiece of a Satyajit Ray retrospective and marks the establishment of the Retrospective Strand. The programme also included Rudolph's WELCOME TO LA, Jarman's JUBILEE and HARLAN COUNTY, USA.

1979
The third Cambridge Film Festival in 1979 included the premieres of Ingmar Bergman's Autumn Sonata, Herzog's Nosferatu and Altman's A Wedding. 1979 also featured a retrospective on the Polish filmmaker Andrzej Wajda.

1980–1989

1980
At the fourth Festival in 1980, audiences saw the UK Premieres of Petit's RADIO ON, Roeg's BAD TIMING and Loach's BLACK JACK.

1981
1981 marked the 5th Festival, and the first Festival with current Festival Director, Tony Jones, at the helm.

The Festival in 1981 screened a newly restored version of Gance's NAPOLEON, alongside a Bertrand Tavernier retrospective. It was also the first year to have 'away' screenings at the Arts Theatre in St Edward's Passage.

1982
1982 saw a general widening of the Festival programme and hosted the UK Premiere of another Werner Herzog film, FITZCARRALDO.

1983
In 1983, the 7th Festival hosted the Premiere Sayles' LIANNA. The Retrospective Strand was focused on Indian filmmaker Mrinal Sen.

1984
In 1984, at the 8th Festival, Wim Wenders was in attendance to present his film PARIS, TEXAS. For the Retrospective Strand, the work of Volker Schlondorff was highlighted.

1985
At the 9th Cambridge Film Festival Francesco Rosi introduced CARMEN to audiences as part of his retrospective. A second retrospective strand on Percy Adlon was also featured.

1986
At the 10th Festival in 1986 a new print of Powell and Pressburger's GONE TO EARTH was screened. Other screenings that year included Mona Lisa, directed by Neil Jordan, and the film and TV work of David Hare.

1987
In 1987 at the 11th CFF, Peter Greenaway presented THE BELLY OF AN ARCHITECT. This was part of a 'Made in Britain' programme which also includes a John McGrath retrospective.

1988
The 12th Festival in 1988 had Jean-Claude Carriere as a Festival guest. THE UNBEARABLE LIGHTNESS OF BEING was the centrepiece of a Philip Kaufman retrospective.

1989
In 1989 there were retrospectives on Robert Bresson and Working Title. There was also a tribute to John Cassavetes and a series of films to investigate the influence of Cahiers du Cinéma, and Buster Keaton's SHERLOCK JNR.

1990–2000

1990
At the 14th Festival, he programme included a Pedro Almodovar Retrospective, and screenings of Malle's MILOU IN MAY alongside Stillman's METROPOLITAN.

1991
At the 15th Festival, the Festival screened Premieres of Scott's THELMA AND LOUISE and the Coen Brothers' BARTON FINK. The retrospective in 1991 was of Monika Treut.

1992
At the 16th Festival, there were the UK premieres of RESERVOIR DOGS and August's THE BEST INTENTIONS. Bruce Beresford and Agnieszka Holland attended retrospectives of their work, and there was a tribute to BFI film production.

1993
At the 17th Festival, Peter Greenaway attended the UK Premiere of THE BABY OF MACON. Other titles included Sayles' PASSION FISH and Haas' THE MUSIC OF CHANCE.

1994
At the 18th Cambridge Film Festival there was the premiere of the THREE COLOURS trilogy as part of the first ever full Kieslowski retrospective.

1995
In 1995 at the 19th Festival, Jeunet and Caro attended the Premiere of THE CITY OF LOST CHILDREN. The Festival's centennial tribute to Buster Keaton contained his rarely seen final masterpieces THE CAMERAMAN and SPITE MARRIAGE. Two other retrospectives celebrated Patricia Rozema and Lars von Trier.

1996
At the 20th Festival, French critic Michel Ciment introduced a French programme which included Audiard's A SELF-MADE HERO and Breillat's PARFAIT AMOUR. Greenaway's THE PILLOW BOOK Premiered and retrospectives featured Jack Cardiff and Jan Jakub Kolski.

1997-2000
After the 20th Festival in 1996, the Festival took a few years off.

2001–2009

2001
2001 featured the premieres of SIDEWALKS OF NEW YORK, BROTHERHOOD OF THE WOLF, OTESANEK, BEIJING BICYCLE, BETELNUT BEAUTY, SWORDFISH, SCRATCH, THE ISLE & SW9. As part of 70mm Widescreen Weekends the Festival screened 2001: A SPACE ODYSSEY, THE KING AND I, LAWRENCE OF ARABIA, PATHFINDER, MY FAIR LADY, and VERTIGO.

2002
The Festival launched with the UK Premiere of TALK TO HER and closed with the UK Premiere of David Cronenberg's SPIDER.

Other Premieres included BOWLING FOR COLUMBINE, LOST IN LA MANCHA, GERRY, HEAVEN, and INTACTO. Alex Cox attended the Premiere of his REVENGERS TRAGEDY and Richard Harris makes one of his last public appearances at the UK Premiere of MY KINGDOM. Peter Wintonick attended a season of his work, and the Festival hosted tributes to Milos Forman, Tod Browning and Lon Chaney, and Darius Mehrjui.

2003
Amongst 50 UK Premieres the Festival screened SPIRITED AWAY, PIRATES OF THE CARIBBEAN, GOODBYE, LENIN!, TIME OF THE WOLF, ALL THE REAL GIRLS, BELLEVILLE RENDEZVOUS, WHALE RIDER and SPELLBOUND; Cate Blanchett and Joel Schumacher attended a special screening of VERONICA GUERIN, Jane Birkin presented MERCI DR REY, and Peter Greenaway attended the Premiere of his TULSE LUPER SUITCASES PART ONE: THE MOAB STORY. The Festival hosted the first UK Film Parliament, and held an Alexander Dovzhenko retrospective.

2004
2004 Highlights amongst the Festival's 47 UK premieres included STAGE BEAUTY, BEFORE SUNSET, SUPER SIZE ME, CLEAN, COMME UNE IMAGE, COFFEE AND CIGARETTES, RIDING GIANTS, Spike Lee's SHE HATE ME, and Robert Lepage's THE FAR SIDE OF THE MOON.

The Festival brought scores of international filmmakers to Cambridge: Sir Richard Eyre launched the Festival at the opening night presentation of STAGE BEAUTY; Julie Delpy presented the closing night screening of BEFORE SUNSET; and Robert Carradine introduced the UK premiere of Sam Fuller's THE BIG RED ONE: THE RECONSTRUCTION.

2005
A packed silver jubilee programme included UK Premieres of The Last Mitterrand; CRASH; BROKEN FLOWERS; Hayao Miyazaki's HOWL'S MOVING CASTLE, introduced by the author of the film's source novel, Diana Wynne Jones; KING'S GAME; NIGHTWATCH; SARABAND; SILVER CITY (attended by director John Sayles); WITH BLOOD ON MY HANDS - PUSHER 2 introduced by director Nicolas Winding Refn, who also curated a season of film's that have influenced his work; GHOST IN THE SHELL 2: INNOCENCE; ENRON: THE SMARTEST GUYS IN THE ROOM; ROCK SCHOOL; and FOREST FOR THE TREES, alongside a Studio Ghibli season and a retrospective for the Russian silent director Dziga Vertov.

2006
Two major additions to the Festival proved highly popular; an ambitious programme of free screenings introduced Artist's Moving Image work to new viewers, and the daily Festival Podcasts. This year Volver won the Audience Award.

2007
UK premieres included the opening night film LADY CHATTERLEY, ANNA M, THE WALKER and the latest film from Studio Ghibli, TALES FROM EARTHSEA. The festival closed with UK premieres of THE HOAX and THE 11TH HOUR. A season celebrating the best in New German cinema was once again curated by Monika Treut and eclectic shorts and documentaries including THE MAN WHO SHOT CHINATOWN and DELIVER US FROM EVIL contributed to the programme. Kenneth Branagh and Brian Blessed attended AS YOU LIKE IT.

2008
In 2008 the Festival opened with Walter Salles' Linha De Passe, and Tilda Swinton was one of the guests for the UK Premiere of Julia.

The Retrospective this year was on Derek Jarman: Remembered season, and Hey Negrita play a live set in after a screening of the documentary We Dreamed America. Peter Greenaway attended a Q&A for his film Nightwatching.

2009
A collaboration with the Festival and BAFTA brought: Michael Palin: A Life In Pictures where Mark Kermode interviewed Michael Palin at Ely Cathedral.

David Mitchell and Robert Webb were joined by writers Sam Bain and Jesse Armstrong, previewing an episode from the new series of Peep Show, showing clips of their favourite moments and taking the audience's questions.

2010–present

2010
In 2010 the closing night film was Made in Dagenham. Festival regular and film music master Neil Brand hosted a workshop about creating music for film, and director Stephen Frears took part in a career retrospective, as well as discussing his latest film, Tamara Drew. Also, The Dodge Brothers accompanied Neil Brand in soundtracking Beggars of Life.

2011
Paddy Considine visited Cambridge to present his directorial debut, Tyrannosaur, and the Festival opened in style with a special preview of Tinker Tailor Soldier Spy. In attendance were the director, Tomas Alfredson, screenwriter Peter Straughan, and two of the film's lead actors - Gary Oldman and John Hurt.

2012
The centrepiece this year was season of a dozen Hitchcock films, stretching from his early silents to his peak period in the 50s and early 60s. Five of the most well-known titles – North by Northwest, Vertigo, Psycho, The Birds, and Marnie – were shown in brand new digital prints.

2013
The 33rd Festival screened Deadcat directed by Stefan Georgiou. Alongside his filmmaking, Stefan was one of the judges for Short Reel, the Student Filmmaker Award, the winning film screening as part of the Festival each year.

2014
The 34th Cambridge Film Festival ran from 28 August – 7 September.

2015
The 35th Cambridge Film Festival ran from 3–13 September 2016.

Highlights included BBC Arena at 40: Night and Day 24 Hours, a 3-D special event with Brian May, and a BAFTA Kids workshop with Ben Shires and Katie Thistleton.

The Festival's opening films included Magic in the Moonlight which marked the 20th Woody Allen preview at the Festival, and the premiere of The Kidnapping of Michel Houellebecq

2016
The 36th Film Festival's programme ran from 20 to 27 October.

2017
The 37th Film Festival ran from 19 to 26 October. It opened with Battle of the Sexes and closed with Lynne Ramsay's You Were Never Really Here.

2018
The 38th will run from 25 October to 1 November.

Film categories and strands
The Festival programme is divided up into strands. Some of these strands will reoccur each year, and others provide a special focus on a filmmaker for that year.

Opening Films Strand
The Opening Film Strand is a recurring strand and includes the one or two films shown on the Opening Night. This was Ali and Ava in 2021, and The Banshees of Inisherin in 2022.

Closing Film Strand
The Closing Film Strand is a recurring strand and includes the one and final screening of the festival, on the Closing Night. This was The Electrical Life of Louis Wain in 2021, and The Silent Twins in 2022.

New 2022 Strands

In Dreams Are Monsters: A horror-focused feast for the senses, celebrating cult classics and contemporary feminist supernatural tales

Resilience: The fight and protests for change during conflicts around the world, and challenging stereotypes of different cultures. 

Wildly Wonderful: Curious adventures, amazing real-life stories and the bizarre and brilliant tales of independent cinema

Recurring Strands

Gala Screenings: Exclusive previews of exceptional films and returning home to the big screen

International Festival Highlights: Award-winning titles from film festivals across the world.

Camera Catalonia Strand: A recurring strand to showcase Catalan cinema.

Connection and Disconnection: The fluctuation of time, memory and relationships, including thrillers and mysteries of the world. 

Short Fusion Strand: A recurring strand that showcases the best in contemporary short films from all over the world.

Outstanding Contribution Award: 

Surprise Film: A surprise film, where the audience buys a ticket to the show without knowing anything about it. Previous Surprise Films included: Up!, Pirates of the Caribbean, A Cock and Bull Story, Burn After Reading, Looper, The Personal History of David Copperfield and Hit The Road.

New 2021 Strands

Creativity on Film: Artistic stories of lockdown theatre, virtual reality, ballet and film preservation. 

Japan 2021: A window on contemporary Japanese cinema, in partnership with the BFI

Nature & Community: Reflecting on the urgency of global warming and climate change. 

Liberty: A collection of stories on migration, racism, politics and unity, calling out injustice in society.

Previous Strands since 1977

Retrospective Strand: Highlighted the work of an influential filmmaker.

Contemporary German Strand: The strand was designed to showcase established and new talent from new German Cinema, including features and shorts. 

The Family Film Festival Strand: Established in the 30th Cambridge Film Festival in 2010. The strand included children's films, TV shows and workshops. Previous years have featured films such as: The Gruffalo, Frozen (2013 film) and Monsters University, as well as workshops in slapstick filmmaking, and a sneak preview of the 3D restoration of The Lion King in 2011.

Retro 3-D Strand: The 2014 strand showcased the newly digitally restored 3-D classics from the '50s including The Creature From The Black Lagoon, House of Wax, Inferno, and The Mad Magician.

Golden, Silver & Crystal Punt Awards
Each year the Festival awards audience awards to the Best Feature (The Golden Punt Award), Best Documentary (Silver Punt Award), and Best Short Film (Crystal Punt Award).

2013 Golden, Silver & Crystal Punt Award winners
 Golden Punt Award for Best Fiction Feature - The Forgotten Kingdom
 Silver Punt Award for Best Documentary - Black Africa, White Marble
 Crystal Punt Award for Best Short Film - Rhino Full Throttle

2014 Golden, Silver & Crystal Punt Award winners
 Golden Punt Award for Best Fiction Feature - Monica Z
 Silver Punt Award for Best Documentary - A Poem In Exile
 Crystal Punt Award for Best Short Film - The Showreel

2015 Golden, Silver & Crystal Punt Award winners
 Golden Punt Award for Best Fiction Feature - Bill
 Silver Punt Award For Best Documentary - Streetkids United II: The Girls From Rio
 Crystal Punt Award for Best Short Film - Group B

2016 Golden, Silver & Crystal Punt Award winners
 Golden Punt Award for Best Fiction Feature - Chocolat
 Silver Punt Award for Best Documentary - Future Baby
 Crystal Punt Award for Best Short Film - Speechless by Robin Polák

2019 Golden, Silver & Crystal Punt Award winners
 Golden Punt Award for Best Fiction Feature - Castle of Dreams
 Silver Punt Award For Best Documentary - Streetkids United III
 Crystal Punt Award for Best Short Film - Alina by Rami Kodeih

2021 Golden, Silver & Crystal Punt Award winners
 Golden Punt Award for Best Fiction Feature - Coppelia by Jeff Tudor, Steven De Beul & Ben Tesseur
 Silver Punt Award For Best Documentary - Film, The Living Record of Our Memory by Inés Toharia
 Crystal Punt Award for Best Short Film - Georgia by Jayil Pak

2022 Awards: Golden Punt for Fiction Feature, Golden Punt for Documentary Feature & Crystal Punt for Short Film winners
For the 2022 edition, the festival has decided to change the award structure, so that both Fiction and Documentary features are eligible for the Golden Punt Award.

Venues
The Festival takes place in Cambridge's three-screened Arts Picturehouse, a local arts cinema run by Picturehouse. Since 2005 the Festival has expanded to take in other formal arts venues such as the nearby The Light Cinema Cambridge (Previously Cambridge Cineworld multiplex), arts venue The Junction, and Sawston Cinema, as well as interesting nontraditional venues such as pedestrianised Cambridge streets, local churches and the colleges of the University. Some special outdoor screenings are held each year, most notably the Movies on the Meadows screenings at Grantchester Meadows shown on an inflatable screen.

Movies on the Meadows
Movies on the Meadows was one of the UK's largest outdoor screening events held at Grantchester Meadows, Cambridge. Over the August bank holiday weekend films screen on giant inflatable screens positioned on the banks of the river Cam. The films show simultaneously each night and audiences tune into their preferred film using a radio set and headphones. The last event was in 2019

Audiences can bring their own picnics or browse the varied food and drink on offer from local vendors.

Movies on the Meadows 2014
Six Films, Three Screens, Two Nights, One River, Millions of Stars.

Saturday 23 August 2014 was family themed and screened:
 The Lego Movie
 The Grand Budapest Hotel
 Cinema Paradiso

Sunday 24 August 2014 was sci-fi themed and showed:
 Close Encounters of the Third Kind
 Flash Gordon
 Things to Come

Movies on the Meadows 2015
Movies on the Meadows, the seventh year of annual screenings, was 29–31 August with a total of nine films shown.

Saturday 29 screened:

 2001: A Space Odyssey
 Paddington
 The Theory of Everything

Sunday 30 screened:

 Back To The Future
 Brief Encounter
 The Railway Children

Monday 31 screened:

 Far From The Madding Crowd
 All That Heaven Allows
 Letter From An Unknown Woman

Movies on the Meadows 2016
Movies on the Meadows was 26–29 August.

References

External links

Official sites
 
 Cambridge Film Trust

Film festivals in England
Festivals in Cambridge
Mass media in Cambridgeshire
Film festivals established in 1977